Andalusia Academy was an independent school in the city of Bristol, England.  Before closure, it was the only full-time independent school with an Islamic ethos in South West England.

The school opened in 2005 and is run by Bristol Islamic Schools Trust (BIST). The trust was formed in 1997 to establish schools that teach the National Curriculum with an Islamic ethos.

The school closed in 2022 after falling standards and financial difficulties.

References

External links
Official website
BIST

Defunct schools in Bristol
Defunct Islamic schools in England
Educational institutions established in 2005
2005 establishments in England
Educational institutions disestablished in 2022
2022 disestablishments in England